Kuraoli is a town and a nagar panchayat (urban municipality) in Mainpuri district in the Indian state of Uttar Pradesh.  Kuraoli was known for Rathore thakur state in 18th century, now it is known for its largest garlic and onion mandi in Uttar Pradesh.

History
Kuraoli in the 18th century was in the kingdom of Rathore Thakur State ruled by  King Laxman Singh, his three Queen's forts was built on 80 bigha of land, 100 metres east of the palace. Queen's Puja Place, was in North Direction about 100 m away, was a pucca pond of about 2 bigha, around the corners of the pond there were wells, As the pond has to be flooded all the time hence the wells do not show up.

There is a 25 km long tunnel which leads to Mainpurik Maharaj Tej Singh's fort.

There were three brothers, who were priests in the king's court, Once the king insulted the three and angered them. They cursed the king, destroying the king's empire.

Those three priests rest in afterlife in different places. These location seems to be famous for melas today, and these places are these names

 Under Galanath Bridge Pipra
 Under Chandrapura Pipara
 Hanuman Temple Under The Papra

After Holi, the mela is held at these three places.

Demographics 
 India census, Kuraoli had a population of 20,680. Males constitute 53% of the population and females 47%. Kuraoli has an average literacy rate of 56%, lower than the national average of 59.5%: male literacy is 65%, and female literacy is 47%. In Kuraoli, 17% of the population is under 6 years of age.

References 

Market-----
Main sadar Market, Ghiror Road Market, G T Road Market. kuraoli Market is not a Good .

Cities and towns in Mainpuri district